Nob may refer to:

People
 NoB (born 1964), Japanese singer Nobuo Yamada
 Nob Yoshigahara (1936–2004), Japanese puzzle-maker

Places
 Nob, Israel, a place in the vicinity of Jerusalem
 Nob Hill, San Francisco, a neighborhood in the California city

Other uses
 Nederlandse Onderwatersport Bond, the Dutch Underwater Federation
 Newell's Old Boys, Argentine football team
 Non-occluded baculovirus, a genus of virus
 "One for his nob", a score in cribbage
 A person of social standing (cf. nobility)
 Derogatory term for a man's penis, typically used as an insult in the UK and Ireland

See also
 Knob (disambiguation)
 NOB (disambiguation)